Ormiston Bolingbroke Academy is a coeducational secondary school and sixth form with academy status in Runcorn, Cheshire.

The school is named after Henry Bolingbroke, who became King Henry IV of England. The school is sponsored by the Ormiston Academies Trust.

Brookvale Comprehensive School merged with Norton Priory School and was renamed Halton High School. Halton was converted to academy status in September 2010 and was renamed Ormiston Bolingbroke Academy. Though it is no longer a community school directly administered by Halton Borough Council, Ormiston Bolingbroke Academy continues to coordinate with Halton Borough Council for admissions.

In 2017, the school caused controversy when it banned a student, who had been undergoing cancer treatment, from attending prom due to her lack of school attendance.

References

Runcorn
Secondary schools in the Borough of Halton
Academies in the Borough of Halton
Ormiston Academies